First Presbyterian Church is a historic Presbyterian church at 402-410 Glen Street in Glens Falls, New York.  It was built in 1927 and is a substantial stone, Neo-gothic-style church in a cruciform plan.  It was designed by architect Ralph Adams Cram (1863-1942).

It was the spiritual home to former Representative Gerald B.H. Solomon, and his funeral was held in the building. It was attended by Speaker Dennis Hastert, Governor George Pataki, and other representatives.

It was added to the National Register of Historic Places in 1984.

See also
 National Register of Historic Places listings in Warren County, New York

References

Presbyterian churches in New York (state)
Churches on the National Register of Historic Places in New York (state)
Churches completed in 1927
20th-century United Church of Christ church buildings
Churches in Warren County, New York
Ralph Adams Cram church buildings
National Register of Historic Places in Warren County, New York